Red Cab to Manhattan is the third album by singer/songwriter Stephen Bishop and his first for Warner Bros. Unlike his previous two albums, Careless and Bish, none of its tracks nor the album itself cracked the top 100 on the Billboard singles or albums charts. Like his previous albums, Bishop had some big name help on the album. Notable contributors include Eric Clapton, Phil Collins and Art Garfunkel.

Reception
Rolling Stone's Stephen Holden wrote that "[t]he new album is a dazzling breakthrough." Stating that "[o]n Red Cab to Manhattan, Stephen Bishop—pop music's most endearing wimp and an unabashed acolyte of Paul Simon and Paul McCartney—adds Steely Dan to his roster of idols." Noting that "[i]t's been ages since Paul McCartney wrote a love song as fetching as "Don't You Worry"... [a]nd "Red Cab to Manhattan" is as delicately shaded a mood piece as any of Paul Simon's miniatures." Concluding that "[t]hough Stephen Bishop still wears his idols on his sleeve, his sense of humor is unique."

Track listing
All songs written by Stephen Bishop, except where noted.

Personnel 
 Stephen Bishop – lead vocals, rhythm track arrangements, backing vocals (1, 2, 4, 6–8), acoustic guitar (1, 2, 4–12), electric guitar (1–3, 7), acoustic piano (2), trombone (9)
 Ed Walsh – synthesizer, programming, koto (9)
 Don Grolnick – acoustic piano (1, 3, 5), Fender Rhodes (1, 8, 9)
 Warren Bernhardt – Fender Rhodes (4, 7, 11), clavinet (11)
 Gary Brooker – Fender Rhodes (6, 10), acoustic piano (10)
 Chris Stainton – acoustic piano (6, 7), Fender Rhodes (10)
 Neil Larsen – acoustic piano (7)
 Sid McGinnis – electric guitar (1, 5, 11)
 David Spinozza – electric guitar (1–3, 5, 8, 9), acoustic guitar (2)
 Hugh McCracken – slide guitar (2)
 Dean Parks – electric guitar (4)
 Eric Clapton – electric guitar (6, 10)
 Jeff Mironov – electric guitar (7, 11)
 Buzz Feiten – electric guitar (11)
 Willie Weeks – bass (1, 3, 5, 8, 9)
 Jeffrey Stanton – bass (2), backing vocals (2, 4)
 Dennis Belfield – bass (4)
 John Giblin – bass (6, 10)
 Neil Jason – bass (7, 11)
 Andy Newmark – drums (1–3, 5, 8, 9)
 Steve Gadd – drums (4)
 Phil Collins – drums (6, 10)
 Chris Parker – drums (11)
 Lenny Castro – percussion (4, 7, 8, 11)
 Mike Mainieri – rhythm track arrangements, marimba (1, 12), synthesizers (4, 11), vibraphone (4, 12), cymbal (8), timpani (8), arrangements (8), vocoder (11), contrabass (12)
 Clive Anstree – cello (6)
 Don Sebesky – horn arrangements and conductor (3)
 Gene Page – arrangements (4)
 Jeremy Lubbock – string and woodwind arrangements (9)
 Phoebe Snow – backing vocals (3)
 David Lasley – backing vocals (4, 11)
 Arnold McCuller – backing vocals (4, 11)
 Art Garfunkel – backing vocals (9)

Production 
 Producers – Tommy LiPuma and Mike Mainieri
 Recorded by Steve Churchyard, Scott Litt and Alan Vonner.
 Mastered by Bob Ludwig at Masterdisk (New York, NY).
 Art Direction and Design – John Kosh
 Cover Photo – Lynn Goldsmith
 Sleeve Photo – Elizabeth Lennard
 Management – Trudy Green

References

1980 albums
Stephen Bishop (singer) albums
Albums arranged by Don Sebesky
Albums arranged by Gene Page
Albums produced by Tommy LiPuma
Warner Records albums